Isthmiade is a genus of beetles in the family Cerambycidae.

containing the following species:

 Isthmiade braconides (Perty, 1832)
 Isthmiade buirettei Tavakilian & Peñaherrera-Leiva, 2005
 Isthmiade cylindrica Zajciw, 1972
 Isthmiade ichneumoniformis Bates, 1870
 Isthmiade laevicollis Tippmann, 1953
 Isthmiade macilenta Bates, 1873
 Isthmiade martinsi Clarke, 2009
 Isthmiade modesta Gounelle, 1911
 Isthmiade necydalea (Linnaeus, 1758)
 Isthmiade parabraconides Giesbert, 1991
 Isthmiade perpulchra Linsley, 1961
 Isthmiade planifrons Zajciw, 1972
 Isthmiade rubra Bates, 1873
 Isthmiade rugosifrons Zajciw, 1972
 Isthmiade vitripennis Giesbert, 1991
 Isthmiade zamalloae Clarke, 2009

References

 
Rhinotragini